Anthozela daressalami is a species of moth of the family Tortricidae. It is found in Tanzania.

The wingspan is about 15 mm. The ground colour of the forewings is whitish pink in the distal half and whitish proximally, sparsely spotted and strigulated (finely streaked) with brown and suffused with olive cream in the basal part and olive grey towards the posterior edge. The costal strigulae are yellowish cream and there is a brown oval blotch before the middle of the termen. The hindwings are brownish to the middle and more cream posteriorly.

Etymology
The species name refers to Dar es Salaam, the type locality.

References

Moths described in 2013
Enarmoniini
Moths of Africa